The Lund International Fantastic Film Festival (abbreviated FFF or LIFFF) is a popular film festival in Lund in southern Sweden that mainly shows fantasy, science fiction and horror films. LIFFF is the largest fantastic/genre film festival in Scandinavia.

In 2015 the festival is broken up into two parts, the first part taking place in Malmö 22—27 September, and the main festival part is held in Lund 22—31 October.

Venues
The festival office and the ticket registers are located in the Lund city hall. Most of the screenings during the main festival in October, as well as the year-round previews, take place in Lund, mainly in the cinemas Kino and SF, while the screenings in September take place in the Malmö cinema Spegeln. Some events and screenings are also arranged in other surrounding cities. Since July 2011, FFF regularly arranges a movie quiz at Moriskan in Malmö.

Internationally
Since it started in 1995, LIFFF has shown films from more than 40 countries. The focus is always on the European continent, that contributes with at least 75% of the films screened at the festival. All movies in the program are Swedish premieres, Scandinavian premieres, European premieres or world premieres. 

In 2001, the Lund Intl. Fantastic Film Festival joined the European Fantastic Film Festivals Federation. Together, they arrange the Méliès competition - one of LIFFF's several international competitions. The Méliès competition of LIFFF is held in late September, in Malmö.

Guests of honour

Every year, LIFFF invites a number of the film makers whose works have been selected for screening at the festival. These guests of honour often hold Q & A sessions after their films.

Notable guests from previous years include:

Peter Greenaway
Terry Gilliam
Neil Gaiman
Corey Feldman
Jennifer Ulrich
Alain Robbe-Grillet
Marc Caro
Alexandre Aja

See also
Other genre film festivals
 Fantafestival

References

External links 
Official page
LIFFF on Facebook
The LIFFF movie archives
The Federation's LIFFF page

Film festivals in Sweden
Fantasy and horror film festivals
Science fiction film festivals